Khanmakan (also Romanized as Khānmakān; also known as Jannat Makān (Persian: جنت مكان), Khvāh Makān, and Khvān Makān) is a village in Toghrol Al Jerd Rural District, Toghrol Al Jerd District, Kuhbanan County, Kerman Province, Iran. At the 2006 census, its population was 238, in 58 families.

References 

Populated places in Kuhbanan County